Fibronectin is a high-molecular weight (~500-~600 kDa) glycoprotein of the extracellular matrix that binds to membrane-spanning receptor proteins called integrins. Fibronectin also binds to other extracellular matrix proteins such as collagen, fibrin, and heparan sulfate proteoglycans (e.g. syndecans).

Fibronectin exists as a protein dimer, consisting of two nearly identical monomers linked by a pair of disulfide bonds. The fibronectin protein is produced from a single gene, but alternative splicing of its pre-mRNA leads to the creation of several isoforms.

Two types of fibronectin are present in vertebrates:
 soluble plasma fibronectin (formerly called "cold-insoluble globulin", or CIg) is a major protein component of blood plasma (300 μg/ml) and is produced in the liver by hepatocytes.
 insoluble cellular fibronectin is a major component of the extracellular matrix. It is secreted by various cells, primarily fibroblasts, as a soluble protein dimer and is then assembled into an insoluble matrix in a complex cell-mediated process.

Fibronectin plays a major role in cell adhesion, growth, migration, and differentiation, and it is important for processes such as wound healing and embryonic development.  Altered fibronectin expression, degradation, and organization has been associated with a number of pathologies, including cancer, arthritis, and fibrosis.

Structure 
Fibronectin exists as a protein dimer, consisting of two nearly identical polypeptide chains linked by a pair of C-terminal disulfide bonds.  Each fibronectin subunit has a molecular weight of ~230–~275 kDa and contains three types of modules: type I, II, and III.  All three modules are composed of two anti-parallel β-sheets resulting in a Beta-sandwich; however, type I and type II are stabilized by intra-chain disulfide bonds, while type III modules do not contain any disulfide bonds. The absence of disulfide bonds in type III modules allows them to partially unfold under applied force.

Three regions of variable splicing occur along the length of the fibronectin protomer.  One or both of the "extra" type III modules (EIIIA and EIIIB) may be present in cellular fibronectin, but they are never present in plasma fibronectin.  A "variable" V-region exists between III14–15 (the 14th and 15th type III module).  The V-region structure is different from the type I, II, and III modules, and its presence and length may vary.  The V-region contains the binding site for α4β1 integrins.  It is present in most cellular fibronectin, but only one of the two subunits in a plasma fibronectin dimer contains a V-region sequence.

The modules are arranged into several functional and protein-binding domains along the length of a fibronectin monomer. There are four fibronectin-binding domains, allowing fibronectin to associate with other fibronectin molecules.  One of these fibronectin-binding domains, I1–5, is referred to as the "assembly domain", and it is required for the initiation of fibronectin matrix assembly. Modules III9–10 correspond to the "cell-binding domain" of fibronectin. The RGD sequence (Arg–Gly–Asp) is located in III10 and is the site of cell attachment via α5β1 and αVβ3 integrins on the cell surface. The "synergy site" is in III9 and has a role in modulating fibronectin's association with α5β1 integrins. Fibronectin also contains domains for fibrin-binding (I1–5, I10–12), collagen-binding (I6–9), fibulin-1-binding (III13–14),  heparin-binding and syndecan-binding (III12–14).

Function 
Fibronectin has numerous functions that ensure the normal functioning of vertebrate organisms.  It is involved in cell adhesion, growth, migration, and differentiation.  Cellular fibronectin is assembled into the extracellular matrix, an insoluble network that separates and supports the organs and tissues of an organism.

Fibronectin plays a crucial role in wound healing.  Along with fibrin, plasma fibronectin is deposited at the site of injury, forming a blood clot that stops bleeding and protects the underlying tissue.  As repair of the injured tissue continues, fibroblasts and macrophages begin to remodel the area, degrading the proteins that form the provisional blood clot matrix and replacing them with a matrix that more resembles the normal, surrounding tissue. Fibroblasts secrete proteases, including matrix metalloproteinases, that digest the plasma fibronectin, and then the fibroblasts secrete cellular fibronectin and assemble it into an insoluble matrix.  Fragmentation of fibronectin by proteases has been suggested to promote wound contraction, a critical step in wound healing. Fragmenting fibronectin further exposes its V-region, which contains the site for α4β1 integrin binding. These fragments of fibronectin are believed to enhance the binding of α4β1 integrin-expressing cells, allowing them to adhere to and forcefully contract the surrounding matrix.

Fibronectin is necessary for embryogenesis, and inactivating the gene for fibronectin results in early embryonic lethality. Fibronectin is important for guiding cell attachment and migration during embryonic development.  In mammalian development, the absence of fibronectin leads to defects in mesodermal, neural tube, and vascular development.  Similarly, the absence of a normal fibronectin matrix in developing amphibians causes defects in mesodermal patterning and inhibits gastrulation.

Fibronectin is also found in normal human saliva, which helps prevent colonization of the oral cavity and pharynx by pathogenic bacteria.

Matrix assembly 
Cellular fibronectin is assembled into an insoluble fibrillar matrix in a complex cell-mediated process.  Fibronectin matrix assembly begins when soluble, compact fibronectin dimers are secreted from cells, often fibroblasts.  These soluble dimers bind to α5β1 integrin receptors on the cell surface and aid in clustering the integrins.  The local concentration of integrin-bound fibronectin increases, allowing bound fibronectin molecules to more readily interact with one another.  Short fibronectin fibrils then begin to form between adjacent cells.  As matrix assembly proceeds, the soluble fibrils are converted into larger insoluble fibrils that comprise the extracellular matrix.

Fibronectin's shift from soluble to insoluble fibrils proceeds when cryptic fibronectin-binding sites are exposed along the length of a bound fibronectin molecule. Cells are believed to stretch fibronectin by pulling on their fibronectin-bound integrin receptors. This force partially unfolds the fibronectin ligand, unmasking cryptic fibronectin-binding sites and allowing nearby fibronectin molecules to associate. This fibronectin-fibronectin interaction enables the soluble, cell-associated fibrils to branch and stabilize into an insoluble fibronectin matrix.

A transmembrane protein, CD93, has been shown to be essential for fibronectin matrix assembly (fibrillogenesis) in human dermal blood endothelial cells. As a consequence, knockdown of CD93 in these cells resulted in the disruption of the fibronectin fibrillogenesis. Moreover, the CD93 knockout mice retinas displayed disrupted fibronectin matrix at the retinal sprouting front.

Role in cancer
Several morphological changes has been observed in tumors and tumor-derived cell lines that have been attributed to decreased fibronectin expression, increased fibronectin degradation, and/or decreased expression of fibronectin-binding receptors, such as α5β1 integrins.

Fibronectin has been implicated in carcinoma development. In lung carcinoma, fibronectin expression is increased especially in non-small cell lung carcinoma. The adhesion of lung carcinoma cells to fibronectin enhances tumorigenicity and confers resistance to apoptosis-inducing chemotherapeutic agents. Fibronectin has been shown to stimulate the gonadal steroids that interact with vertebrate androgen receptors, which are capable of controlling the expression of cyclin D and related genes involved in cell cycle control. These observations suggest that fibronectin may promote lung tumor growth/survival and resistance to therapy, and it could represent a novel target for the development of new anticancer drugs.

Fibronectin 1 acts as a potential biomarker for radioresistance and for pan-cancer prognosis.

FN1-FGFR1 fusion is frequent in phosphaturic mesenchymal tumours.

Role in wound healing 
Fibronectin has profound effects on wound healing, including the formation of proper substratum for migration and growth of cells during the development and organization of granulation tissue, as well as remodeling and resynthesis of the connective tissue matrix. The biological significance of fibronectin in vivo was studied during the mechanism of wound healing.  Plasma fibronectin levels are decreased in acute inflammation or following surgical trauma and in patients with disseminated intravascular coagulation.

Fibronectin is located in the extracellular matrix of embryonic and adult tissues (not in the basement membranes of the adult tissues), but may be more widely distributed in inflammatory lesions.  During blood clotting, the fibronectin remains associated with the clot, covalently cross-linked to fibrin with the help of Factor XIII (fibrin-stabilizing factor). Fibroblasts play a major role in wound healing by adhering to fibrin. Fibroblast adhesion to fibrin requires fibronectin, and was strongest when the fibronectin was cross-linked to the fibrin. Patients with Factor XIII deficiencies display impairment in wound healing as fibroblasts don't grow well in fibrin lacking Factor XIII. Fibronectin promotes particle phagocytosis by both macrophages and fibroblasts. Collagen deposition at the wound site by fibroblasts takes place with the help of fibronectin. Fibronectin was also observed to be closely associated with the newly deposited collagen fibrils. Based on the size and histological staining characteristics of the fibrils, it is likely that at least in part they are composed of type III collagen (reticulin). An in vitro study with native collagen demonstrated that fibronectin binds to type III collagen rather than other types.

In vivo vs in vitro 
Plasma fibronectin, which is synthesized by hepatocytes, and fibronectin synthesized by cultured fibroblasts are similar but not identical; immunological, structural, and functional differences have been reported. It is likely that these differences result from differential processing of a single nascent mRNA. Nevertheless, plasma fibronectin can be insolubilized into the tissue extracellular matrix in vitro and in vivo. Both plasma and cellular fibronectins in the matrix form high molecular weight, disulfide-bonded multimers. The mechanism of formation of these multimers is not presently known. Plasma fibronectin has been shown to contain two free sulfhydryls per subunit (X), and cellular fibronectin has been shown to contain at least one. These sulfhydryls probably are buried within the tertiary structure, because sulfhydryls are exposed when the fibronectin is denatured. Such denaturation results in the oxidation of free sulfhydryls and formation of disulfide-bonded fibronectin multimers. This has led to speculation that the free sulfhydryls may be involved in formation of disulfide-bonded fibronectin multimers in the extracellular matrix. Consistent with this, sulfhydryl modification of fibronectin with N-ethylmaleimide prevents binding to cell layers. Tryptic cleavage patterns of multimeric fibronectin do not reveal the disulfide-bonded fragments that would be expected if multimerization involved one or both of the free sulfhydryls. The free sulfhydryls of fibronectin are not required for the binding of fibronectin to the cell layer or for its subsequent incorporation into the extracellular matrix. Disulfide-bonded multimerization of fibronectin in the cell layer occurs by disulfide bond exchange in the disulfide-rich amino-terminal one-third of the molecule.

Interactions 
Besides integrin, fibronectin binds to many other host and non-host molecules. For example, it has been shown to interact with proteins such fibrin, tenascin, TNF-α, BMP-1, rotavirus NSP-4, and many fibronectin-binding proteins from bacteria (like FBP-A; FBP-B on the N-terminal domain), as well as the glycosaminoglycan, heparan sulfate.

Fibronectin has been shown to interact with:
 CD44
 COL7A1,
 LPA,
 IGFBP3,
 TNC, and
 TRIB3.

See also 
 Fetal fibronectin
 Fibronectin type I domain
 Fibronectin type II domain
 Fibronectin type III domain
 Monobody, an engineered antibody mimetic based on the structure of the fibronectin type III domain
 Substrate adhesion molecules

References

Further reading

External links 
 Fibronectin, an Extracellular Adhesion Molecule
 The Fibronectin Protein 
 
 Fibronectin molecular interactions
 
 

Glycoproteins
Diagnostic obstetrics and gynaecology
Extracellular matrix proteins